Pei Xiu (224–271), courtesy name Jiyan, was a Chinese cartographer, geographer, politician, and writer of the state of Cao Wei during the late Three Kingdoms period and Jin dynasty of China. He was very much trusted by Sima Zhao, and participated in the suppression of Zhuge Dan's rebellion. Following Sima Yan taking the throne of the newly established Jin dynasty, he and Jia Chong had Cao Huan deprived of his position to accord to the will of heaven. In the year 267, Pei Xiu was appointed as the Minister of Works in the Jin government.

Pei Xiu outlined and analysed the advancements of cartography, surveying and mathematics up until his time. He criticised earlier Han dynasty maps for their lack of precision and quality when representing scale and measured distances, although 20th century archaeological excavations and findings of maps predating the third century prove otherwise. There is also evidence that Zhang Heng (78–139) was the first to establish the grid reference system in Chinese cartography.

As a cartographer

Pei Xiu is best known for his work in cartography. Although professional map-making and use of the grid had existed in China before him, he was the first to mention a plotted geometrical grid reference and graduated scale displayed on the surface of maps to gain greater accuracy in the estimated distance between different locations. Historian Howard Nelson asserts that there is ample written evidence that Pei Xiu derived the idea of the grid reference from the map of Zhang Heng (78–139 CE), a polymath inventor and statesman of the Eastern Han period. Robert Temple asserts that Zhang Heng should also be credited as the first to establish the mathematical grid in cartography, as evidenced by his work in maps, the titles of his lost books, and the hint given in the Book of Later Han (i.e. Zhang Heng "cast a network of coordinates about heaven and earth, and reckoned on the basis of it"). Xiu also created a set of large-area maps that were drawn to scale. He produced a set of principles that stressed the importance of consistent scaling, directional measurements, and adjustments in land measurements in the terrain that was being mapped.

The preface to Pei Xiu's written work was preserved in the 35th volume of the Book of Jin, which is the official history for the Jin dynasty and one of the Twenty-four Histories. It was written in the Book of Jin that Pei Xiu made a critical study of ancient texts in order to update the naming conventions of geographic locations described in old texts. His maps – drawn on rolls of silk – were presented to Emperor Wu, who preserved them in the imperial court's archives. Pei Xiu's maps have since been lost, decayed or destroyed. Yet the oldest existing terrain maps from China date to the fourth century BCE, found in a Qin tomb in present-day Gansu in 1986. Han dynasty maps from the second century BCE were found earlier in the 1973 excavation of Mawangdui.

In 1697, the Qing dynasty cartographer Hu Wei (胡渭) reconstructed Pei Xiu's maps in his Yugong Zhuizhui (禹貢錐指, A Few Points on the Vast Subject of the Yu Gong). Modern scholars have also used Pei Xiu's writing to reproduce his works, and historians such as Herrmann have compared Pei Xiu to other great ancient cartographers such as the Greek cartographer Ptolemy (83–161).

Written works

Pei Xiu wrote a preface to his maps with essential background information regarding older maps in China. He also provided a great deal of criticism about the existing maps from the Han dynasty in his time. Later Chinese ideas about the quality of maps made during the Han dynasty and before stem from the assessment given by Pei Xiu, which was not a positive one. Pei Xiu noted that the extant Han maps at his disposal were of little use since they featured too many inaccuracies and exaggerations in measured distance between locations. However, the Qin maps and Mawangdui maps of the Han dynasty discovered by modern archaeologists were far superior in quality than those examined and criticised by Pei Xiu. It was not until the 20th century that Pei Xiu's third century assessment of earlier maps' dismal quality would be overturned and disproven. The makers of the Han maps were familiar with the use of scale, while the Qin map makers had pinpointed the course of rivers with some accuracy. What these earlier maps did not feature was topographical elevation, which Pei Xiu would outline with his six principles of cartography.

Pei Xiu's preface describes geographers in the Xia, Shang and Zhou dynasties, although the earliest known geographical work was the Yu Gong chapter of the Shu Ji or Book of Documents, compiled in the fifth century BCE during the mid Zhou period. Pei Xiu also referred to Xiao He (died 193), who assembled the maps made during the fall of the Qin dynasty. This was done after the founder of the Han dynasty, Liu Bang (died 195 BC), had sacked the city of Xianyang. Pei Xiu states:

Pei Xiu continues his preface with short background information on the conquests by the Jin dynasty and the impressive maps commissioned by Sima Zhao (211–264). He then described the methods he used to create new maps while examining the ancient text of the Yu Gong or Tribute of Yu to create historical maps:

Pei Xiu outlined six principles that should be observed when creating a map. He then defended his position and each of the six principles with a short explanation as to how they provide better accuracy in map-making and cartography. The first three principles outlined the use of scale (fenlü), direction (zhunwang) and road distance (daoli), while the last three principles are used to properly calculate distances on uneven terrain as represented on a flat, two dimensional map. Pei Xiu states:

See also
 Lists of people of the Three Kingdoms

Notes

References
 
 
 
 

224 births
271 deaths
3rd-century geographers
Cao Wei politicians
Chinese cartographers
Chinese geographers
Chinese non-fiction writers
Jin dynasty (266–420) politicians
Jin dynasty (266–420) writers
Pei clan of Hedong
Scientists from Shanxi
Writers from Shanxi